Prince of Zhao, was a first-rank princely peerage used during Ming dynasty, this peerage title initially was created by Hongwu Emperor for his ninth son he was deceased. The princedom later created again by Yongle Emperor and was held by Zhu Gaosui, 3rd son of Yongle Emperor.

Generation name / poem
As members of this princedom were descendants of Yongle Emperor, the generation poem they used was:-

The mainline members used the poem until the name "Ci" (慈), which was the same generation as Chongzhen Emperor's son.

Princedom of Zhao

Zhu Gaosui (朱高燧; 19 Jan 1383 - 5 Oct 1431) (1st), third son of Yongle Emperor, he was made the Prince of Zhao in 1404 by his father, then took his fief in Zhangde in 1425 and died in 1431. His full posthumous name was Prince Jian of Zhao (趙簡王)
Zhu Zhanba (朱瞻坺; 1411 - 15 Feb 1427), Zhu Gaosui's eldest son, was made the hereditary prince in 1424 but died in 1427. His posthumous name was Hereditary Prince Daoxi of Zhao (趙悼僖世子)
Zhu Zhanque (朱瞻塙; 1413 - 1454) (2nd), Zhu Gaosui's second son, he initially was made a commandery prince, under the title Prince of Anyang Comm. (安陽郡王) in 1424. He succeeded the princedom from 1432 to 1455. His full posthumous name was Prince Hui of Zhao (趙惠王)
Zhu Qizi (朱祁鎡; 1430 - 1460) (3rd), Zhu Zhanque's eldest son, he succeeded the princedom from 1456 to 1460. His full posthumous name was Prince Dao of Zhao (趙悼王)
Zhu Jianzuo (朱見灂; 1453 - 1502) (4th), Zhu Qizi's eldest son, he succeeded the princedom from 1465 to 1502. His full posthumous name was Prince Jing of Zhao (趙靖王)
Zhu Youcai (朱祐棌; 1460 - 1518) (5th), Zhu Jianzuo's third son, he initially was made a commandery prince, under the title Prince of Qingliu Comm. (清流郡王). He succeeded the princedom from 1503 to 1518. His full posthumous name was Prince Zhuang of Zhao (趙莊王)
Zhu Houyu (朱厚煜; 1498 - 1560) (6th), Zhu Youcai's eldest son, he succeeded the princedom from 1521 and committed suicide in 1560. His full posthumous name was Prince Kang of Zhao (趙康王)
Zhu Zaipei (朱載培; 1510 - 1537), Zhu Houyu's eldest son, initially was made a commandery prince, under the title of Prince of Huojia Comm. from 1531 and died in 1537, before his father. His original posthumous name was Prince Zhaoding of Huojia (獲嘉昭定王). He then later posthumously honoured under the posthumous title "Prince Gong of Zhao" (趙恭王), after his grandson succeeded the princedom.
Zhu Yizi (朱翊錙; 1537 - 1559), Zhu Zaipei's eldest son, was designated as the hereditary prince in 1549 but died before his grandfather, he was posthumously honoured under the posthumous title "Prince An of Zhao" (趙安王) after his son succeeded the princedom.
Zhu Changqing (朱常清; 1555 - 1614) (7th), Zhu Yizi's eldest son, he succeeded the princedom from 1565 to 1614. His full posthumous name was Prince Mu of Zhao (趙穆王)
Zhu Yousong (朱由松; d.1614), Zhu Changqing's eldest son, was designated hereditary prince in 1585 but died before his father.
Zhu Yougui (朱由桂; 1590 - 1608), Zhu Changqing's seventh son, was made a commandery prince under the title Prince of Shouguang Comm. from 1599 to 1608. His original posthumous name was Prince Zhaojing of Shouguang (壽光昭敬王), he was posthumously honoured under the posthumous title "Prince Shun of Zhao" (趙順王) after his son succeeded the princedom.
Zhu Ci... (朱慈𢣴) (8th), Zhu Yougui's eldest son, he was designated hereditary prince after the death of his uncle. He succeeded the princedom in 1617. 
Zhu Zaiyuan (朱載垸), Prince of Chenggao Comm. (成皐郡王), Zhu Houyu's fourth son, he was appointed to acting general affairs of Princedom of Zhao from 1538 to 1565, after the death of his eldest brother.
Zhu Yizong (朱翊錝; d.1557), Zhu Zaiyuan's eldest son, was made a defender general under his father's designation from 1557 to 1577
Zhu Changyu (朱常㳛; 1574 - 1644) (9th), Zhu Yizong's eldest son, he initially succeeded the peerage of Prince of Chenggao Comm. from 1587. He succeeded the principality from 1632 and was killed by Li Zicheng in 1644. His posthumous name was Prince Ke of Zhao (趙恪王)
Zhu Youyan (朱由棪; 1614 - 1647) (10th), he succeeded the princedom from 1646 to 1647.

Cadet princedoms

Princedom of Linzhang Comm.
Prince of Linzhang Commandery (臨漳郡王) was created in 1538, for Zhu Qijun, second son of Zhu Zhanhao, the 2nd Prince of Zhao. The princedom was abolished in 1644 when the Ming dynasty extinct.

Zhu Zhanhao, Prince Hui of Zhao, 2nd Prince of Zhao
Zhu Bangjun (朱祁鋆; d.1485) (1st), second son of Zhu Zhanhao, the 2nd Prince of Zhao. He was made Prince of Linzhang in 1444 until his death in 1485. His full posthumous name was Prince Gong'an of Linzhang (臨漳恭安王)
Zhu Jianzhi (朱見淔; d.1516) (2nd), Zhu Bangjun's eldest son. He succeeded the princedom from 1487 until his death in 1516. His full posthumous name was Prince Ronghe of Linzhang (臨漳榮和王)
Zhu Youyi (朱祐杙; d.1505), Zhu Jianzhi's eldest son. He was made a defender general when his father succeeded the princedom, he died before his father and was posthumously honoured as a Prince of Linzhang with the posthumous name "Prince Daohuai of Linzhang" (臨漳悼懷王) after his eldest son succeeded the princedom
Zhu Houke (朱厚炣; d.1529) (3rd), Zhu Youyi's eldest son. He succeeded the princedom from 1521, after his grandfather's death until his death in 1529
Name unknown (d.1590) (4th), Zhu Houke's eldest son. He succeeded the princedom from 1538 until his death in 1590. His full posthumous name was Prince Zhuanghui of Linzhang (臨漳莊惠王)
Zhu Yishuo (朱翊鎙) (5th), Prince Zhuanghui's eldest son. He was designated chief son (heir apparent) in 1586 and succeeded the princedom in 1593
Zhu Changhai (朱常海) (6th), Zhu Yishuo's eldest son. He succeeded the princedom from 1622 until 1644

References

Ming dynasty princely peerages
Imperial families of Ming dynasty